E 311 is a European B class road in Netherlands, connecting the cities of Utrecht and Breda.

Utrecht
Breda (Ginneken en Bavel)

Highway connections 
The E 311 has a total length of 99.3 kilometres, and serves as the connector between the E 30 and the E 19 (E 312). From north to south the following highways share junctions with the E 311:

E30 (Highways 12 and 27) - Lunetten (Utrecht)
E35 (Highway 12) - Lunetten
E25 (Highway 2) - Everdingen
E31 (Highway 15) - Gorinchem
N97 (Highway 59) - Hooipolder
E312 (Highway 58) - Sint Annabosch

The entire route is constructed as a motorway and is part of Highway 27 (Rijksweg A27).

Before the renumbering of the E-roads in the 1980s, this route was known as the E 37.

References

External links 
 UN Economic Commission for Europe: Overall Map of E-road Network (2007)

International E-road network
E311
Motorways in North Brabant
Motorways in South Holland
Motorways in Utrecht (province)
Transport in Breda
Transport in Utrecht (city)